Lewis Pendleton Sheldon (June 9, 1874 in Rutland, Vermont – February 20, 1960 in Biarritz) was an American track and field athlete who competed in jumping events in the late 19th century and early 20th century. He participated in Athletics at the 1900 Summer Olympics in Paris and won bronze medals in triple jump and standing high jump, as well as fourth place in the standing long jump and standing triple jump. His brother is Richard Sheldon.

References

External links

1874 births
1960 deaths
American male triple jumpers
Olympic bronze medalists for the United States in track and field
Athletes (track and field) at the 1900 Summer Olympics
Place of birth missing
Medalists at the 1900 Summer Olympics
Yale University alumni
American emigrants to France
People from Rutland (city), Vermont
Track and field athletes from Vermont